In Broad Daylight is a 1971 American TV film starring Richard Boone, Stella Stevens and Suzanne Pleshette. It was directed by Robert Day and written by Larry Cohen.

Plot 
A blind actor comes up with an elaborate scheme to murder his wife and her lover.

Cast 
 Richard Boone as Anthony Chapel
 Suzanne Pleshette as Kate
 Stella Stevens as Elizabeth
 John Marley as Bergman
 Fred Beir as Alex
 Whit Bissell as Moss
 Paul Smith as Charles
 Ken Sansom as Dr. Grant

Production 
Cohen thought "it wasn't a bad movie" except for the casting of Boone; Cohen felt Boone's face was so distinctive the concept of the film did not work. Cohen says there was some talk of remaking the film years later as a vehicle for Andrea Bocelli but it did not proceed because of concerns over Bocelli's acting ability. The film was executive produced by Aaron Spelling.

Reception 
Academic Tony Williams called the film "one of Cohen's most innovative works" despite the miscasting of Boone.

References

External links
 

1971 films
1971 television films
ABC Movie of the Week
Adultery in films
Films about actors
Films about blind people
Films about murder
American thriller television films
Films with screenplays by Larry Cohen
Films directed by Robert Day
1970s English-language films
1970s American films
Films about disability